Matthijs de Bruijn (born 27 May 1977) is a Dutch water polo player. He competed in the men's tournament at the 2000 Summer Olympics.

References

1977 births
Living people
Dutch male water polo players
Olympic water polo players of the Netherlands
Water polo players at the 2000 Summer Olympics
Sportspeople from Barendrecht